Kirill Igorevich Sarychev (Russian: Кирилл Игоревич Сарычев; born 1 January 1989) is a Russian powerlifter.

Personal life
Sarychev was born on 1 January 1989 in the town of Pugachyov, Saratov Oblast.

Sarychev graduated with honours from School No. 1, Pugachev, Saratov Oblast, and then from the Pugachyov Hydrological Land Improvement Technical College in 2007. In 2012 he earned a degree from the Saratov State Vavilov Agrarian University. , he is a police officer of the Ministry of Internal Affairs General Administration for the city of Moscow.

Powerlifting career
Sarychev first became interested in powerlifting at the age of 15. He soon found a coach, Victor Mikheyev, and made rapid progress. He began preparing for competitions in the International Powerlifting Federation (IPF). He preferred to lift without equipment (raw) but was unable to keep up with other powerlifters who competed in the IPF if he did not use equipment.

In 2009, while at the World Powerlifting Congress World Championships in Rostov-on-Don, Sarychev met Andrey Fedoseyev, who invited him to compete at the 2010 Battle of Champions, to be held in Arkhangelsk. The event featured two raw divisions – bench press and deadlift. Sarychev participated in both. Deadlift placement was determined by the Glossbrenner formula; Sarychev placed fifth, pulling . In the bench press, he placed first, pressing . After this event, Sarychev began training under Boris Sheiko. Sarychev competed at the Battle of Champions again in 2011, winning silver, and for a third time in 2012, winning gold.

At the 2014 Battle of Champions competition, Sarychev bench pressed , passing the  mark of Scot Mendelson set in 2005.
 
In his third attempt, Sarychev raised it even further, pressing .

He benched , squatted , and deadlifted .

Creation of World Raw Powerlifting Federation
In 2014, Sarychev founded a new powerlifting federation, the World Raw Powerlifting Federation (WRPF), and became its president. He has stated he hopes to see powerlifting become an Olympic sport.

References

External links
 
 
 

1989 births
Living people
People from Pugachyov
Russian powerlifters
Sportspeople from Saratov Oblast